Agyei Boakye (born 14 March 1999) is a Ghanaian professional footballer who plays as midfielder for Ghana Premier League side Medeama S.C.

Career

Medeama SC 
Boakye has been playing in the Ghana Premier League for Tarkwa-based side Medeama SC since 2017. He made his debut during the 2017 Ghana Premier League season. On 15 April 2017, he made his debut after coming on in the 90th minute of a 2–0 win over Bechem United, to make a cameo appearance. He made 7 league appearances at the end of the season. During the 2018 Ghana Premier League season, he made a limited 5 league appearances  before the league was abandoned due to the dissolution of the Ghana Football Association (GFA) in June 2018, as a result of the Anas Number 12 Expose.

During the 2019–20 Ghana Premier League season, he played in all 13 league matches out of 15 before the league was cancelled as a result of the COVID-19 pandemic. During the season, he picked up an accumulated number of yellow cards and was suspended from the against International Allies, due to that coach Samuel Boadu had to draft in midfielder Rashid Nortey in his travelling 20-man squad as his replacement.

References

External links 

 
Adjei Boakye of Medeama Sc on the Adonko Premier League Show

Living people
1999 births
Association football midfielders
Ghanaian footballers
Medeama SC players
Ghana Premier League players